Dylmady  (also, Dyl’mady and Dil’mady) is a village in the Astara Rayon of Azerbaijan.

References 

Populated places in Astara District